Standings and Results for Group C of the Regular Season phase of the 2014–15 Euroleague basketball tournament.

Standings

Fixtures and results
All times given below are in Central European Time.

Game 1

Game 2

Game 3

Game 4

Game 5

Game 6

Game 7

Game 8

Game 9

Game 10

Statistics 

Updated to game played on 19 December 2014

References

External links
Standings

2014–15 Euroleague